National Information systems may refer to:

 National Historical Geographic Information System
 National Library and Information System
 National Integrated Drought Information System
 National Education Information System
 National Association for Public Health Statistics and Information Systems
 National Information Systems, Inc. (founded 1972), vendor of Accent R